Anatoly Filippovich Smirnov (1909–1986) was a Soviet scientist working in the field of structural mechanics.

He graduated Moscow Institute of Railroad Engineers in 1935 and taught structural mechanics there since 1936, becoming a Doctor of Technical Sciences in 1945 and professor in 1947.  In 1951, he became a member of the CPSU.  In 1969, he became the director of the Central Research Institute of Building Structures.

References

Soviet scientists
1986 deaths
1909 births